A Grasshopper is a sweet, mint-flavored, after-dinner drink. The name of the drink derives from its green color, which comes from crème de menthe. A bar in the French Quarter of New Orleans, Louisiana, Tujague's, claims the drink was invented in 1918 by its owner, Philip Guichet. The drink gained popularity during the 1950s and 1960s throughout the American South.

Composition
A typical Grasshopper cocktail consists of equal parts green crème de menthe, white crème de cacao, and cream shaken with ice and strained into a chilled cocktail glass.

Variations
A "Vodka" or "Flying" Grasshopper replaces the cream with vodka.

A "Frozen" Grasshopper adds mint ice cream to create a more dessert-like drink.

An "After Eight" adds a layer of dark chocolate liqueur to the crème de menthe, crème de cacao and cream.

In the North Central United States, especially Wisconsin, Grasshoppers are blended drinks, with ice cream substituted for cream.  A related variation is the "Grasshopper milkshake", which contains mint chocolate chip ice cream, milk, and crème de menthe. This is blended and served in a tall glass decorated with a miniature or broken cream-filled chocolate sandwich cookie.

A "Girl Scout Cookie" substitutes peppermint schnapps for crème de menthe.

In celebrating the 85th anniversary of the snackfood, Hostess released a cooking book of recipes using Twinkies. One of the recipes is called a "Twinkie Grasshopper" which is akin to a milkshake.

See also
List of cocktails

References

External links 
 

Cocktails with chocolate liqueur
Cocktails with liqueur
Cocktails with ice cream
Creamy cocktails